Dubăsari (Moldovan Cyrillic alphabet: Дубэсарь) or Dubossary is a city in Transnistria, with a population of 23,650. Claimed by both the Republic of Moldova and the Transnistrian Moldavian Republic, the city is under the latter's administration, and functions as the seat of the Dubăsari District.

Name
The origin of the town name is the plural form of the Romanian archaic word dubăsar ("boatman"), a derivative of dubă ("a small wooden boat"), so "Dubăsari" means "boatmen".

History
Dubăsari is the site of one of the oldest settlements in Moldova, and the Transnistrian region. Stone Age artifacts have been found in the area, and there are several kurgans (presumed Scythian) around the city. First mentions of modern Dubăsari date to the beginning of the 16th century, as a fair populated by Moldavian peasants. The settlement became part of the Russian Empire in 1792, and was granted city status in 1795. It was part of Kherson Governorate from 1803 to 1922.

The murder of a Ukrainian boy, Mikhail Rybachenko, in Dubăsari became one of the triggers of the Kishinev pogrom after the Bessarabetz paper insinuated that he had been murdered by the Jewish community for the purpose of using their blood in the preparation of matzo for Passover. Unlike in Kishinev, the authorities at Dubăsari acted to prevent the pogrom in the town.

In 1924–1940, Dubăsari was part of the Soviet-created Moldavian ASSR. The town was heavily industrialized during the pre-WWII period. In the course of World War II, in 1940, when Bessarabia was occupied by the Soviet Union, it became part of the newly created Moldavian SSR. On 27 July 1941, the town was occupied by German and Romanian troops. It was re-captured by Soviet forces in the summer of 1944.

In 1951–1954, the Dubăsari dam, and a 48 MW hydroelectric power plant Dubossarskaya GES was constructed, and the Dubossary Reservoir was formed.

Dubăsari and its suburbs were the site of major conflict during 1990–1992, that eventually culminated in the War of Transnistria (1992). Since then, it has been controlled by the breakaway administration of Transnistria and tensions has risen most recently during the 2022 Russian invasion of Ukraine.

The city's economy was significantly damaged during the war in 1992.

Population

In 1989, the population of the city was 35,806, including 15,414 Moldovans (Romanians), 10,718 Ukrainians, 8,087 Russians, and 1,587 others. According to the 2004 Census in Transnistria, the city had 23,650 inhabitants, including 8,954 Moldovans, 8,062 Ukrainians, 5,891 Russians, 153 Belarusians, 104 Bulgarians, 90 Armenians, 49 Poles, 66 Gagauzians,  46 Jews, 39 Germans, 31 Gypsies, and 165 others and non-declared.

Notable natives

 Nikolai Sklifosovsky (1836 in Dubasari — 1904) a Russian surgeon and physiologist of Greek origin 
 Pyotr Rachkovsky (1853 in Dubasari – 1910) was chief of Okhrana, the secret service in Imperial Russia. He was based in Paris from 1885 to 1902.
 Ion Creangă (politician) (1883 in Corjova - ??) was a Bessarabian politician
 Isidor Sârbu (1886 in Corjova - 1980) was a Moldavian victim of dekulakization.
 Yosef Baratz (1890 in Coşniţa - 1968 in Israel) was a Zionist activist and Israeli politician.
 Nichita Smochină (1894 in Mahala – 1980  in Bucharest) was a Transnistrian-born activist, scholar and political figure, especially noted for campaigning on behalf of ethnic Romanians in the Soviet Union
 Leonid Corneanu (1909 in Coşniţa - 1957 in Chișinău) was a Moldovan poet, playwright and folklorist.
 Petru Soltan (1931 in Coşniţa – 2016 in Chișinău) was a Moldovan mathematician and politician
 Timofei Moșneaga (1932 in Corjova – 2014) was a Moldovan physician and public figure who served as the Health Minister of Moldova from 1994 to 1997. 
 Vlad Ioviţă (1935 in Cocieri - 1983 in Chişinău) was a writer from Moldova.
 Anatol Codru (1936 in Molovata Nouă - 2010 in Chişinău) was a writer and film director 
 Vladimir Voronin (born 1941 in Corjova) a Moldovan politician. He was the third President of Moldova from 2001 until 2009
 Ștefan Urâtu (born 1951 in Ustia) is a politician from Moldova.
 Vlad Grecu, (born 1959 in Dubăsarii Vechi) a Moldovan writer, now lives in Chişinău
 Mykhaylo Okhendovsky (born 1973 in Dubăsari) Ukrainian lawyer and Chairman of the Central Election Commission of Ukraine
 Igor Pugaci (born 1975 in Dubăsari) is a retired a Moldovan road bicycle racer.
 Anna Odobescu (born 1991 in Dubăsari) is a singer who represented Moldova at the Eurovision Song Contest 2019 in Tel Aviv.

In fiction 

 The Sisters of the Winter Wood by Rena Rossner is set in Dubossary, before and during the 1903 Kishinev pogrom.

References

External links 
 Dubosary (Dubăsari) in the Geographical Dictionary of the Kingdom of Poland (1881) 
Site of city of Dubăsari
Dubăsari (in Romanian)

Cities and towns in Transnistria
Cities and towns in Moldova
Yedisan
Tiraspolsky Uyezd
Dubăsari District, Transnistria